The 2018–19 Arkansas Razorbacks women's basketball team represented the University of Arkansas in the 2018–19 NCAA Division I women's basketball season. They were led by second-year head coach Mike Neighbors and played their home games at Bud Walton Arena in Fayetteville, Arkansas.

The Razorbacks finished the regular season 17–13, 6–10 in conference play. They were seeded 10th in the SEC tournament, earning a first-round bye. The team advanced to the finals, the lowest seed to do so in tournament history, against Mississippi State, where they lost 101–70. The team completed its postseason by advancing to the third round in the Women's National Invitation Tournament, where they lost to TCU.

Previous season
The Razorbacks finished the 2017–18 season 13–18, 3–13 in SEC play to finish in a tie for eleventh place. They advanced to the second round of the SEC tournament, where they lost to Texas A&M.

Roster

Schedule

|-
!colspan=9 style=| Exhibition

|-
!colspan=9 style=| Non-conference regular season

|-
!colspan=9 style=| SEC regular season

|-
!colspan=9 style=| SEC Tournament

|-
!colspan=9 style=| Women's National Invitation Tournament

Rankings
2018–19 NCAA Division I women's basketball rankings

See also
2018–19 Arkansas Razorbacks men's basketball team

References

Arkansas
Arkansas Razorbacks women's basketball seasons
Arkansas Razor
Arkansas Razor
Arkansas